Westport House in Westport, County Mayo, Ireland, is a country house, historically the family seat of the Marquess of Sligo and the Brownes and designed by notable eighteenth century architects Richard Cassels, Thomas Ivory and James Wyatt. The title and the house were separated in 2014, following the death of Jeremy Browne, 11th Marquess of Sligo, who left the estate to his five daughters. His titles passed to his first cousin, Sebastian Ulick Browne, a residential estate agent in Australia. The house was purchased by the Hughes Group in 2017.

History
Colonel John Browne (1638–1711), built the first Westport House on the site of the O'Malley castle of Cahernamart. He married The Hon. Maud Bourke, daughter of Theobald Bourke, 3rd Viscount Mayo and the great-great-granddaughter of Grace O'Malley. He was a Roman Catholic who fought on the Jacobite side in the War of the Two Kings. His grandson, however, converted to the established Church of Ireland, and prospered.

The house was rebuilt by the Browne family in the 18th century. The architects were Richard Cassels, who built (1730) the east section of the house facing the town, and later Thomas Ivory and James Wyatt, who built the other three façades to form a quadrangle. North and South wings were added to the designs of Benjamin Wyatt. The South wing, which contained a library, was burned soon after it was built due to a defect in the heating system. It was subsequently rebuilt. After the fire, the Second Marquess covered in the open courtyard and made a new library by running a gallery around the now enclosed interior wall. The drawing room was reconstructed and the ceiling painted to represent sky, with cornices of painted Pompeian figures and a mantle piece by the then John Flaxman. He bought eighteen landscape pictures by the then unknown James A. O’Connor.
in 1858 George Wilkinson designed a Grand Staircase of Sicilian marble for the Third Marquess of Sligo, replacing the library of the Second Marquess. This was made by Italian workmen. The balustrade of phosphor-bronze castings with the Browne eagle motif was by Skidmore, Coventry. It cost under £6,000.

A model farm was built in the demesne during the early part of the 19th century, with accommodation for housing animals and animal feed. The remains of an old boathouse are open to the sea.

After the death of the 11th Marquess of Sligo in July 2014, the house passed to his five daughters, as a result of private legislation passed by Seanad in 1993, enabling him to disinherit his cousin Sebastian Browne, the heir to the peerages and estate.

On 17 January 2017, the daughters of the 11th Marquess sold Westport House to the Hughes family, a local business family in Westport, ending the Browne family's association with Westport House lasting hundreds of years. The Hughes family planned to spend €50 million on refurbishment.

National Asset Management Agency (NAMA) and sale

In 2007, the privately owned estate received a grant of 1.314M Euros for repairs to Westport House, from the state funded Heritage Council.

In October 2015, it was revealed that the Westport House Estate was in NAMA for debts secured on the  estate, but not the house, for almost 10 million Euros. In January 2017, Westport House was sold to the Hughes family of Westport.

Slavery links

The house was built for and owned by the Browne family, some of whom were wealthy slave and plantation owners in Jamaica. A prominent slave-owning head of the family was The 2nd Marquess of Sligo and his wife, Lady Sligo (Lady Hester Catherine de Burgh). The 2nd Marquess served as Governor of Jamaica from 1834 to 1836.

An exhibition at Westport House styles The 2nd Marquess of Sligo as 'Champion of the Slaves', a suggestion that one historian refers to as 'hyperbole', pointing out that "Browne benefited from slavery from the cradle to the grave and did not free his slaves until the institution of slavery was abolished by an act of parliament", and that the 2nd Lord Sligo also claimed, and received, substantial compensation from the British Government for the loss of his slaves.

The Jamaican plantations (Kellys pen' and 'Cocoa Walk') and slave workers referred to above, came into the Browne family through the marriage in 1752 of Peter Browne to Elizabeth Kelly, only daughter and heir of Denis Kelly, from Co Galway who became Chief Justice of Jamaica in the 18th century.

Howe Peter Browne, 2nd Marquess of Sligo was said to be both famous and infamous. He spent the latter part of his life fighting against slavery both as Governor General of Jamaica and afterwards in the House of Lords. He is known in the history of Jamaica as 'Champion of the Slaves' and the first free slave village in the world, Sligoville, in Jamaica, is named in his honour.

Irish pirate queen Grace O'Malley
During the 16th century, Grace O'Malley - Gráinne Ní Mhaille in her native Irish language, and more commonly known as Gráinne Mhaol - was a famous 'pirate queen' of Connacht. After her death, a report stated that for forty years, she was the stay of all rebellions in the west. She was chief of the O'Malley Clan and ruled the seas around Mayo.

A statue of Gráinne Mhaol by the artist Michael Cooper is on display in Westport House, and a bronze casting of the statue is situated on the grounds near the house.

The original house was built by Colonel John Browne, a Jacobite, who was at the Siege of Limerick, and his wife Maude Bourke, who was Grace O'Malley's great-great-granddaughter. The house then did not have the lake or a dam and the tide rose and fell against the walls.

Architecture

The east front of the house was built in 1730 by Colonel John Browne's grandson, also John – 1st Earl of Altamont, who hired the German architect Richard Cassels. It is built with limestone taken from the quarry south of the estate.

On the south facade is dated 1778. The large dining room was decorated by James Wyatt. The doors are mahogany brought back from the family estates in Jamaica. There are still a number of original Wyatt drawings on show, along with some of his son's, Benjamin Wyatt. The wings on the north and south sides of the house were built by Wyatt junior. The staircase and enclosure of the lightwell in the middle of the house was undertaken later. The last part of the development was the creation of the terraces on the west side of the house. The original library burned down shortly after it was built due to a heating misfunction.

Art and antiques
Westport House is also unusual in that it is complete with original contents, most of which have a long association with Ireland. Among the pictures are portraits by Sir Joshua Reynolds of the 1st Earl of Altamont, of the Rt. Hon. Denis Browne, brother of the 1st Marquess of Sligo and a member of Grattan's Parliament; and by William Beechey, of Howe Peter – the 2nd Marquess of Sligo, who spent four months in an English jail for bribing British seamen in time of war to bring his ship, full of antiquities from Greece, to Westport. Howe Peter was a friend of George IV and the poet Byron. There is a portrait of Earl Howe – Admiral of the Fleet, father of the 1st Marchioness of Sligo, by John Singleton Copley. Artworks also include a collection of landscapes painted in the locality by James Arthur O'Connor. Other artists such as Chalon, Barrett, Gibson, John Opie, Brooks and Lavery are part of the collection.
In the alcove on the marble staircase stands the marble Angel of Welcome by American sculptor Charles Francis Fuller, which the Third Marquess purchased in Rome in 1862. The flame on the forehead represents the Holy Spirit.

There is also a collection of waxwork figures by Gems Display Figures, which are a tribute to the literary, arts and music achievements of west Ireland, including William Butler Yeats, Lady Gregory and Turlough Carolan.

Other original items on show in Westport House are a fine collection of old English and Irish silver, which include some 18th-century Irish "potato" or dish rings; Waterford glass; a library with many old Irish books and the Mayo Legion Flag which was brought to Ireland by General Humbert when he invaded the country in 1798, and which has been in Westport House since. Westport House was occupied by General Humbert's troops.

Browne family

The Browne family remained the owners of Westport House for almost three hundred years, until 17 January 2017.

The Browne family came to County Mayo from Sussex, England, in the sixteenth century. Through marriage with the daughters of native Irish landowners and by purchase they built up a small estate near The Neale. As a Catholic family they were fortunate that their lands were situated in Connacht, thereby escaping the notorious confiscations of Cromwell.

John Browne III (1638–1711), a successful lawyer, became landlord at Westport following his marriage to The Hon. Maud Bourke, daughter of The 3rd Viscount Mayo and great-great-granddaughter of 'the Pirate Queen', Granuaile (Grace O'Malley; 1530–1603), in 1669. Browne greatly increased his estate in Mayo and Galway including Cahernamart (Cathair-na-Mart - the Fort of the Beeves), a ruinous O'Malley fortress on the shores of Clew Bay.

Browne's good fortune was soon swept away as Ireland was plunged into chaos in the Williamite Wars. A Catholic, he supported the Jacobite cause and was a Colonel in the Jacobite army. From the iron mines on his lands near Westport, he supplied the army with cannonballs and weapons. The defeat of the Jacobite army at Aughrim and Limerick in 1691 brought financial ruin in the confiscations that followed. At his death in 1711 his estate was reduced to a modest mansion at Cahernamart and a few hundred acres. The Penal Laws which followed left his grandson, John IV, with little option but to conform to the prevailing religion in the hope of surviving the confiscations and political upheaval.

Browne gradually revived the family fortune. Young and ambitious, he set about extending his estate and transforming the old O'Malley castle into modern-day Westport House. He replaced the old village of Cathair-na-Mart with a new town of Westport, where he established a thriving linen industry. An excellent farmer, he set about improving the fertility of his lands, which, for the most part, were of poor quality. In 1771, he was created The 1st Earl of Altamont. In 1752, his son and heir, Peter, 2nd Earl of Altamont, married the heiress, Elizabeth Kelly from County Galway, whose estates in Jamaica further enhanced the family fortune.

John, 3rd Earl of Altamont, continued the innovative farming tradition of his grandfather. He created the lake to the west of Westport House, planted trees and employed James Wyatt to decorate the gallery and dining room. He laid out the principal streets of the present town of Westport, and many of the streets in Westport today are named after Browne family members such as Peter Street, James Street, Altamont Street and John's Row. He also established a theatre at The Octagon and built the town of Louisburgh. In 1787, he married Louisa Catherine, daughter and heiress of the English Earl Howe. During his lifetime the French-inspired 1798 Rebellion occurred. Aided by the arbitrary actions of Denis Browne, his younger brother, against the Irish insurgents (which earned him the reputation of 'black sheep' of the family), the Rebellion was crushed. The 3rd Lord Altamont was created The 1st Marquess of Sligo after the Act of Union in 1800. He seldom attended Parliament in London, being more content at home in Westport.

His only son Howe Browne, 2nd Marquess of Sligo, inherited in 1809 at the age of twenty-one. Extravagant and generous, his early life subscribed to the popular image of a 'regency buck'. Friend of Byron, de Quincy and the Prince Regent, he travelled extensively throughout Europe. He excavated at Mycenae and discovered the 3,000-year-old columns of the Treasury of Atreus. To bring them back to Westport, he took some seamen from a British warship and was subsequently sentenced to four months in Newgate Prison. He married Lady Hester de Burgh, the Earl of Clanricarde's daughter, by whom he had fourteen children, and settled down to life in Westport. The 2nd Lord Sligo added the north and south wings, the library, and commissioned much furniture, china, silver and paintings for the House. He bred racehorses both at Westport and at the Curragh. One of his horses, Waxy, won the Derby. He owned the last two of the breed of Irish wolfhound. In 1834, he was appointed Governor of Jamaica with the difficult task of overseeing the 'apprenticeship system', in a period prior to the full emancipation of the slaves. He met with great opposition from plantation owners and other vested interests. He was the first to emancipate the slaves on the family's Jamaican plantations. The first 'free village' in the world, Sligoville, was subsequently named in his honour. A liberal, he was one of the few Irish peers to vote for Catholic Emancipation. He died in 1845 as the clouds of the Great Famine descended over Mayo.

His son, George, 3rd Marquess of Sligo, inherited a terrible legacy. The West of Ireland was worst affected by the famine. Westport House was closed and with no rents forthcoming, the 3rd Lord Sligo borrowed where he could, spending £50,000 of his own money to alleviate the suffering of the tenants. He imported cargoes of meal to Westport Quay and subvented the local workhouse, then the only shelter available to the destitute. He wrote tirelessly to the British Government, demanding that they do more to help the famine victims. He wrote and had published a pamphlet outlining many pioneering reforms of the economic conditions that had led to the famine. In 1854, on being offered the Order of St Patrick, an honour once held by his father and grandfather, disillusioned by Britain's Irish policy (a recurring sentiment at Westport House), the 3rd Marquess wrote 'I have no desire for the honour.' In 1878 he married Isobel Peyronett and moved to Surrey for the rest of his life as his wife as she did not care for Westport.

Lord John Browne succeeded his brother as 4th Marquess of Sligo in 1896. He had to contend with the huge changes that occurred in the ownership of land in Ireland in the late nineteenth and early twentieth century. Above all he was a 'professional' farmer, whose main contribution was to transform a reduced and almost bankrupt estate into a profitable one, solely from agriculture. He had repairs done to the house and gardens. 

Henry Ulick Browne, 5th Marquess of Sligo (1831-1913), another brother of the 3rd and 4th Marquesses, succeeded on the death of the fourth Marquess. He had by then retired from his career in the Indian Civil Service. He had been much at Westport since his retirement in 1889 and he and his wife occupied the big house, while the Fourth Marquess, a batchelor, lived in his own small house.

George Browne, 6th Marquess of Sligo succeeded his father in 1913.  An active man, he rebuilt the stable block and made the terraces above the lake on the west side of the house.. HE installed central heating, electric light and six bathrooms, and ensured the house was in a good state of repair. He added a sawmill, planted Sitka spruce and a salmon hatchery at the fisheries a salmon hatchery and planted extensively. He also modernised the interior of the House and created the Italianate terrace to the west.

Ulick de Burgh Browne, 7th Marquess of Sligo succeeded his father in  1935.  He inherited a house in fine condition and workmen with a tradition who could tackle any job. He died at Westport in 1941 and for four years life there was frozen. The Sixth Marchioness, in her eighties left London and lived in Westport until the end of the war.

Arthur Howe Browne succeeded as 8th Marquess in 1941 at the age of 74. A younger son of a younger son he earned a living in the British Army. He came home in 1945.  The compulsory acquisition of the town lawns for local public housing occurred in the time of the 8th Marquess, which altered the historic relationship that had existed between the House and town of Westport. He was succeeded by his brother Terence, 9th Marquess who died in England a year later.

Denis, 10th Marquess of Sligo, succeeded his uncle in 1953. He and his wife, Jose Gauche, found the extensive farmlands unprofitable. The plan was to open the house to the paying public although this would be the first house on the republic of Ireland to try this. First Jose Browne had to go through each room discarding the detritus gathered over centuries. She and her husband were both artists and Connauult area was not known for its tourism in the 1950s. She was able to design and make furnishing fabrics to suit the Westport House rooms as she had always made her own clothes and her own accessories. She crocheted bedspreads to decorate the beds and she is creditted with being the house's chatelaine and its interior designer. the 11th Marquess was to then lead the business. He died in 2014.

The Browne family reluctantly put Westport House on the market in 2016 and sold the house to the Hughes family, a local business group, on 17 January 2017, ending the long links that bound Westport House to the Browne family. The Hughes family committed to improving the facilities and to the possibility of expansion.

Music and performing arts
On 23 and 24 June 2012, the inaugural Westport Festival of Music and Performing Arts took place at Westport House. Some of the acts that performed were Jools Holland, The Waterboys, Ryan Sheridan, Imelda May, Seasick Steve, Mundy, and Royseven.

On 26–27 August 2017, Aiken Promotions used Westport House as one of two venues for the first Harvest Country Music Festival. Acts included headliners Miranda Lambert & Nathan Carter.

References

External links
 Westport House website

Buildings and structures in County Mayo
Historic house museums in the Republic of Ireland
Museums in County Mayo
Gardens in County Mayo
Browne family (Anglo-Irish aristocracy)
Westport, County Mayo
Richard Cassels buildings